Novaya Moskva (lit. New Moscow) is a rural locality (a village) in Shkotovsky District of Primorsky Krai, Russia. Population: 114 (2005 est.).

References

Rural localities in Primorsky Krai